Antonius Theodorus Colenbrander (3 May 1889 – 24 September 1929) was a Dutch horse rider. He competed at the 1924 Summer Olympics in the three-days event and at the 1928 Summer Olympics in jumping and won a gold medal with the Dutch team in 1924. He died after a bad fall from his horse at a jumping competition in Zelhem.

References

1889 births
1929 deaths
Dutch male equestrians
Event riders
Equestrians at the 1924 Summer Olympics
Equestrians at the 1928 Summer Olympics
Olympic equestrians of the Netherlands
Olympic gold medalists for the Netherlands
Olympic medalists in equestrian
People from Batavia, Dutch East Indies
Medalists at the 1924 Summer Olympics
20th-century Dutch people